Shinee's Yunhanam is a South Korean variety show starring the South Korean boy group, Shinee and narrated by Son Ga-in of Brown Eyed Girls. It's Shinee's first variety show 3 months after their debut. Yunhanam literally means a young man dating an older woman. This was also the theme of their song Replay.

Background
They try to attract the attention of a guest noona to do things which are requested by her and one member is selected at the end of each episode to go on a date with her. Son Ga-in of Brown Eyed Girls which also the narrator is also appeared in the episode 12.

Winner

References

Korean Broadcasting System original programming
South Korean reality television series
Yunhanam
2008 South Korean television series debuts
2008 South Korean television series endings